Let's Do It Now is the third album of dance artist Haddaway, which includes the three singles "What About Me", "Who Do You Love", and "You're Taking My Heart". The record was released on December 28, 1998 by BMG.

Track listing
 "Let's Do It Now" (3:28) 
 "You're Taking My Heart" (3:23)
 "Touch" (4:33)
 "Who Do You Love" (3:23)
 "What About Me" (4:07)
 "Satisfaction" (4:32)
 "Make Me Believe" (4:36)
 "I'll Do It for You" (4:41)
 "Bring Back My Memories" (3:37)
 "Don't Cut the Line" (3:50)
 "I'll Wait for You" (4:15)
 "Mr. President" (5:04)

Credits
Producers: Dee Dee Halligan, Junior Torello

References

External links
Let's Do It Now – Lyrics
Let's Do It Now

1998 albums
Haddaway albums
Arista Records albums